The term hilya (Arabic , plural: ḥilan, ḥulan; ,) denotes both a visual form in Ottoman art and a religious genre of Ottoman Turkish literature, each dealing with the physical description of Muhammad. Hilya literally means "ornament".

They originate with the discipline of shama'il, the study of Muhammad's appearance and character, based on hadith accounts, most notably Tirmidhi's al-Shama'il al-Muhamadiyyah wa al-Khasa'il al-Mustafawiyyah ("The Sublime Characteristics of Muhammad").

In Ottoman-era folk Islam, there was a belief that reading and possessing Muhammad's description protects the person from trouble in this world and the next, it became customary to carry such descriptions, rendered in fine calligraphy and illuminated, as amulets. In 17th-century Ottoman Turkey, hilyes developed into an art form with a standard layout, often framed and used as a wall decoration.

Later hilyes were also written for the first four Caliphs, the companions of Muhammad, Muhammad's grandchildren (Hasan and Hussein) and Islamic saints (walis).

Origins in hadith 

Hilye, both as the literary genre and as the graphic art form, originates from shama'il, the study of Muhammad's appearance and character. The best source on this subject is considered to be Imam Tirmidhi's al-Shama'il al-Muhamadiyyah wa al-Khasa'il al-Mustafawiyyah ("The Sublime Characteristics of Muhammad"). The acceptance and influence of this work has led to the use of the term "shama'il" (appearance) to mean Muhammad's fine morals and unique physical beauty. As they contained hadiths describing Muhammad's spirit and physique, shama-il have been the source of hilye. The best known and accepted of these hadith are attributed to his son-in-law and cousin Ali. The sources of hilye have been the six main hadith books along with other hadith sources, attributed to people such as Aisha, `Abd Allah ibn `Abbas, Abu Hurairah, Hasan ibn Ali. While shama'il lists the physical and spiritual characteristics of Muhammad in detail, in hilye these are written about in a literary style.

Among other descriptive Shama'il text are the Dala'il al-Nubuwwah of Al-Bayhaqi, Tarih-i Isfahan of Abu Naeem Isfahani, Al-Wafa bi Fadha'il al-Mustafa of Abu'l-Faraj ibn al-Jawzi and Al-Shifa of Qadi Ayyad are the main shemaa-il and hilya books.

Literary genre
Although many hilyes exist in Turkish literature, Persian literature does not have many examples of the shama'il and hilye genre. Abu Naeem Isfahani wrote a work titled Hilyetü'l-Evliya, but it is not about Muhammad. For this reason, the hilye is considered one of Turkey's national literary genres. Turkish literature has also some early works that may have inspired the appearance of the hilye as a literary genre. The Vesiletü'n-necat of Süleyman Çelebi (1351–1422 :fr:Suleyman Çelebi (de Bursa)), and the Muhammeddiye of Yazıcıoğlu Mehmed, referred to Muhammad's characteristics.

A 255-verse long Risale-i Resul about the attributes of Muhammad, written by a writer with the penname of Şerifi, was presented to Şehzade Bayezid, one of the sons of Suleiman the Magnificent, at an unknown date that was presumably before the Shahzade's death in 1562. This is believed to be the earliest hilye in verse form in Turkish literature. However, the Hilye-i Şerif by Mehmet Hakani (d. 1606–07) is considered the finest example of the genre (see section below). The first hilye written in prose form is Hilye-i Celile ve Şemail-i 'Aliye by Hoca Sadeddin Efendi.

Although the hilye tradition started with descriptions of Muhammad, later hilyes were written about the first four Caliphs, the companions of Muhammad, Muhammad's grandchildren (Hasan and Hussein) and Islamic saints (walis) such as Mevlana. The second most important hilye, after Hakani's, is considered to be Cevri İbrahim Çelebi's hilye, Hilye-i Çihar-Yar-ı Güzin (1630), about the physical appearance of the first four caliphs. Another important hilye writer is Neşâtî Ahmed Dede (d. 1674), whose 184-verse long poem is about the physical characteristics of 14 prophets and Adam. Other notable hilyes are Dursunzâde Bakayi's Hilye'tûl-Enbiya ve Çeyar-ı Güzîn (hilye of the prophet and his four caliphs), Nahifi's (d. 1738) prose hilye Nüzhet-ûl-Ahyar fi Tercüment-iş-Şemîl-i and Arif Süleyman Bey's (1761) Nazire-î Hakânî.

Hilyes can be written as standalone prose or poems (often in the masnavi form). They can also be part of two other forms of Turkish Islamic literature, a Mevlid (account of Muhammad's life) or a Mir'aj-name (accounts of Muhammad's Night Journey).

Art form

While writers developed hilye as a literary genre, calligraphers and illuminators developed it into a decorative art form. Because of their supposed protective effect, a practice developed in Ottoman Turkey of the 17th century of carrying Muhammad's description on one's person. Similarly, because of the belief that a house with a hilye will not see poverty, trouble, fear or the devil, such texts came to be displayed prominently in a house. The term of hilye was used for the art form for presenting these texts. Thus, the hilye, as a vehicle for Muhammad's presence after his death, was believed to have a talismanic effect, capable of protecting a house, a child, a traveller, or a person in difficulty. In addition, the purpose of the hilye is to help visualize Muhammad as a mediator between the sacred and human worlds, to connect with him by using the viewing of the hilye as an opportunity to send a traditional blessing upon him, and to establish an intimacy with him.

The pocket hilyes were written on a piece of paper, small enough to fit in a breast pocket after being folded in three. The folding lines were reinforced with cloth or leather. Other pocket hilyes were made of wood. Hilyes to be displayed on a wall were prepared on paper mounted on wooden panels, although in the 19th century, thick paper sheets became another medium. The top part of hilyes that were laid on wooded panels were carved and cut out in the form of a crown. The crown part would be richly illuminated and miniatures of Medina, the tomb of Muhammad or the Kabaa would be placed there, together or separately.

Ottoman Turks have commissioned scribes to write hilyes in fine calligraphy and had them decorated with illuminators. Serving as a textual portraits of the prophets, hilye panels have decorated homes for centuries. These calligraphic panels were often framed and came to be used as wall decorations in houses, mosques and shrines, fulfilling an equivalent role to that played by images of Jesus in the Christian tradition. As symbolic art, they provided an aesthetically pleasing reminder of Muhammad's presence without involving the type of "graven image" unacceptable to most Muslims' sensitivities. Although not common, some hilyes show the influence of Orthodox Christian icon-making because they are made like triptychs with foldable side panels.

The first recorded instance of Hilye-i Sherif panels is generally believed to have been prepared by the notable scribe Hâfiz Osman (1642–1698). He was one of earliest scribes known to make such works, although it has been suggested that another famous scribe, Ahmed Karahisarî (1468–1556), may have created one hilye panel about a century before. Hafız Osman was known to have experimented with pocket hilyes in his youth, one of these dates from 1668. Its text was written in very small naskh script and has dimensions of 22x14 cm. It consisted of a description of Mohammad in Arabic, and below that its Turkish translation, written in diagonal, to create a triangular block of text.

A characteristic feature of the texts shown at the centre of hilyes is their praise for the beauty of Muhammad's physical appearance and character. While containing a verbal description of what Muhammad looked like, a hilye leaves picturing Muhammad's appearance to the reader's imagination, in line with the mainly aniconic nature of Islamic art.

Standard layout
The standard layout for the Ottoman hilye panel is generally attributed to Hâfiz Osman. This layout is generally considered to be the best and has come to be the classical form. It contains the following elements:

The baş makam ("head station"), a top panel containing a bismallah or blessing
The göbek ("belly"), a round shape containing the first part of the main text in naskh script. It often contains the description of Muhammad by Ali (according to Tirmidhi), with minor variations(see quote in the Origins section above).
The hilâl ("crescent"), an optional section with no text, which is often gilded. A crescent encircling the göbek, with its thick middle part at the bottom. Together, the göbek and hilal also evoke the image of the sun and the moon.
The kösheler ("corners"), usually four rounded compartments surrounding the göbek, typically containing the names of the four Rashidun or "rightly-guided" Caliphs according to Sunnis, or in some cases other titles of Muhammad, names of his companions, or some of the names of Allah.
The etek ("skirt" or lower part) containing the conclusion of the text begun in the göbek, a short prayer, and the signature of the artist. If the main text fits completely in the göbek, the etek may be absent.
The koltuklar ("empty spaces"), two alleys or side panels on either side of the etek that typically contain ornamentation – sometimes illuminated – but no text, although occasionally the names of some of the ten companions of Muhammad are found there.
The iç and dış pervaz ("inner and outer frame"), an ornamental border in correct proportion to the text.

The remainder of the space is taken up with decorative Ottoman illumination, of the type usual for the period, often with a border framing the whole in a contrasting design to the main central field that is the background of the text sections. The "verse" and "corners" normally use a larger thuluth script, while the "head" section with the bismallah is written in muhaqqaq. Unlike the literary genre of hilye, the text on calligraphic hilyes is generally in prose form.

The names in Turkish of the central structural elements of the hilye are, from top to bottom, başmakam (head station), göbek (belly), kuşak (belt) and etek (skirt). This anthropomorphic naming makes it clear that the hilye represents a human body, whose purpose is "to recall semantically the Prophet's presence via a graphic construct". It has been suggested that Hafiz Osman's hilye design might have been inspired by the celebrated Hilye-i Şerif, which in turn was based on the possibly spurious hadith according to which Muhammad has said "... Whoever sees my hilye after me is as though he has seen me... ". If so, a hilye might have been meant to be not read but seen and contemplated, because it is really an image made of plain text.

The standard Hilye-i Şerif composition has been followed by calligraphers since its creation in the late 17th century. Some examples from the 19th century and two made by Hafiz Osman can be seen below.

However, deviations from the standard model do occur and many innovative designs have been produced as well.

Popularity of the graphic form

There are several reasons given for the popularity of graphic hilyes. Islam prohibits the depiction of graphic representations of people that may lead to idols. For this reason, Islamic art developed in the forms of calligraphy, miniatures and other non-figurative arts. In miniatures, Muhammad's face was either veiled or blanked. Because of the prohibition on drawing the face of Muhammad, the need to represent Muhammad was satisfied by writing his name and characteristics.

Many authors have commented that another reason is the affection that Muslims feel for Muhammad, which leads them to read about his physical and moral beauty. The (apocryphal) hadith that those who memorize his hilye and keep it close to their heart will see Muhammad in their dreams would have been another reason. Muslim people's love for Muhammad is considered to be one of the reasons for the display of hilye panels at a prominent place in their homes (see Graphic art form section below).

Hakani has said in his poem that a house with a hilye will be protected from trouble. Another motivation would have been the hadith given by Hakani in the Hilye-i Şerif, which states that those who read and memorize Muhammad's hilye will attain great rewards in this and the other world, will see Muhammad in their dreams, will be protected from many disasters, and will receive Muhammad's esteem.

In the "sebeb-i te'lîf" ve "hâtime" section of the hilye, the writer gives the reasons to write the hilye. Hakani wrote that his reason was to be worthy of Muhammad's holy intercession (shefaat) on doomsday and to receive a prayer from willing readers. Other hilye writers express, usually at the end of the hilye, their desire to be commended to the esteem of Muhammad, the other prophets, or the four caliphs. One hilye writer, Hakim, wrote that he wishes that people will remember Muhammad as they look at his hilye.

Hakani's Hilye-i Şerif has been an object of affection to many Turkish people. His poem has been copied on paper as well as on wooden panels by many calligraphers and has been read with the accompaniment of music in Mawlid ceremonies.

Non-Ottoman forms

As an art form, hilye has mostly been restricted to Ottoman lands. A small number of instances of hilye panels were made in Iran, and they reflect a Shiite adaptation of the form: there is a Persian translation below the Arabic text and the names of the Twelve Imams are listed. In the 19th century, some Iranian hilyes combined the traditional hilye format with the Iranian tradition of pictorial representation of Muhammad and Ali.

There are contemporary exponents of the art outside this region, such as the Pakistani calligrapher Rasheed Butt and the American calligrapher Mohamed Zakariya.

Traditions
In Turkey, giving a hilye panel as a marriage gift for the happiness of the union and safety of the home has been a tradition that is disappearing. Covering such panels with sheer curtains was part of the religious folklore in Istanbul households.

Since Osman's time, every Turkish calligrapher has been expected to produce at least one hilye, using the three muhaqqaq, thuluth and naskh scripts. It is a common tradition for masters of calligraphy to obtain their diploma of competency (icazetname) after completing a hilye panel as their final assignment.

The art of hilye flourishes in Turkey. Contemporary artists continue to create hilyes in the classical form as well as to innovate. Modern hilyes maintain the essence of a hilye, even while the appearance of the elements of the hilye is customized or calligraphy is used to create abstract or figurative works. Contemporary hilyes are exhibited in major exhibitions in Turkey as well as outside the country.

Theological opinion
According to the Süleymaniye Vakfı, a Salafi influenced religious foundation in Turkey that publishes religious opinions (fatwa), hilye panels are works of art, but hanging them in the home has no religious value. That is, they provide no merit to those who hang them or carry them on their persons, and those who do not possess them have no deficit.

A key hilye in poetry: Hilye-i Şerif

Hilye-i Şerif ("The Noble Description", 1598–1599) by Mehmet Hakani, consisting of 712 verses, lists Muhammad's features as reported by Ali (see quotation in the Origins section above), then comments on each of them in 12-20 verses. Although some have found it to be of not great poetic merit, it was popular due to its subject matter. The poem is significant for having established the genre of hilye. Later hilye writers such as Cevri, Nesati and Nafihi have praised Hakani and stated that they were following in his footsteps. The poem contains several themes detailed below that underscore the importance of reading and writing about the attributes of Muhammad.

In his hilye, Hakani mentions the following hadith, which he attributes to Ali: A short time before Muhammad's death, when his crying daughter Fatima said to him: "Ya Rasul-Allah, I will not be able to see your face any more!" Muhammad commanded, "Ya Ali, write down my appearance, for seeing my qualities is like seeing myself." The origin of this hadith is not known. Although probably apocryphal, it has had a fundamental effect on the development of the hilye genre. This hadith has been repeated by most other hilye writers.

Hakani states another hadith, also attributed to Ali. This hadith of unknown origin is said to have been in circulation since the 9th century but is not found in the reliable hadith collections. Repeated in other hilyes after Hakani's, this hadith has been influential in the establishment of the genre.:

Hakani's hilye includes a story about a poor man coming to the Abbasid Caliph Harun al-Rashid and presenting him a piece of paper on which Muhammad's hilye is written. Al-Rashid is so delighted to see this that he regales the dervish and rewards him with sacs of jewelry. At night, he sees Muhammad in his dream. Muhammad says to him "you received and honored this poor man, so I will make you happy. God gave me the good news that whoever looks at my hilye and gets delight from it, presses it to his chest and protects it like his life, will be protected from hellfires on Doomsday; he will not suffer in this world nor in the other. You will be worthy of the sight of my face, and even more, of my holy lights."

It has become customary for other hilye authors that followed Hakani to mention in the introduction of their hilye (called havas-i hilye) the hadith that seeing Muhammad in one's dream is the same as seeing him. The Harun Al-Rashid story has also been mentioned frequently by other authors as well. These elements from Hakani's hilye have established the belief that reading and writing hilyes protects the person from all trouble, in this world as well as the next.

References

Further reading
Behiery, Valerie, "Hilya", in Muhammad in History, Thought, and Culture: An Encyclopedia of the Prophet of God (2 vols.), Edited by C. Fitzpatrick and A. Walker, Santa Barbara, ABC-CLIO, 2014, Vol I, pp. 258–263.

External links
 "The Hilya, or the Adornment of the Prophet – A Calligraphic Icon", by Carl W. Ernst and Rasheed Butt
 "The Hilye of the Prophet Muhammad", by Mohamed Zakariya
 "Hilye-i Şerife", by Faruk Taşkale
 Slideshow of hilyes on YouTube 
 Many examples of hilye panels at the Foundation for the Classical Turkish Arts
 Calligraphic representations of the Prophet Muhammad (Shick, I.C.)

Islamic arts of the book
Turkish art
Islamic calligraphy
Cultural depictions of Muhammad
Islamic terminology